Adam Kieran O'Reilly (born 11 May 2001) is an Irish professional footballer who plays as a midfielder for Derry City in the League of Ireland Premier Division. He made his professional debut for Preston North End in December 2018, aged 17 before spending time on loan at Hyde United, Stalybridge Celtic (over two spells), Bamber Bridge, Waterford and  St Patrick's Athletic.

Club career

Early career
Raised in Mahon, Cork, O'Reilly progressed through the academy of local side Ringmahon Rangers, where he played under his father, Kieran. During his time with the club he produced an act of sportsmanship that went viral, passing a penalty straight to the opposing goalkeeper after it was deemed that it was unfairly awarded to his side.

Preston North End
He signed for Preston North End in December 2016 after successfully trialing with the club. During his first full season with the club's academy, he helped his side reach the Lancashire FA Youth Cup final, was named in the team of the season and won Preston's Scholar of the Year award. The highlight of the season came in February 2018 when he was named on the substitute's bench for the first team's Championship match against Wolverhampton Wanderers, although he was not called to enter the field of play.

On 29 December 2018, following a string of injuries in the first-team squad, O'Reilly was afforded the chance to feature on the bench again in a league encounter against Aston Villa. He made his debut in the final minutes of the match, coming on as a substitute for compatriot Graham Burke as the two sides played out to a 1–1 draw. In doing so, he became the 20th-youngest player ever to represent the club. The following month, he signed his first professional contract with Preston. On 27 October 2020, he signed a new contract with the club until the summer of 2023.

Loan to Hyde United
At the start of March 2019, O'Reilly signed for Hyde United on a short-term loan deal and made his debut for the club in a 2–1 defeat to Farsley Celtic. The first goal of O'Reilly's senior career came on 30 March 2019, scoring in a 5–3 win over Stafford Rangers. He made 4 appearances for the club, scoring 1 goal.

Loan to Stalybridge Celtic
In January 2020 he joined Stalybridge Celtic on loan until the end of the season along with fellow Preston teammate Ethan Walker. His first goal for the club came on 4 February 2020 in a 2–1 loss against Gainsborough Trinity. He returned to Preston following 7 appearances in all competitions and 1 goal.

Loan to Bamber Bridge
In October 2020 he joined Bamber Bridge on a short term loan deal until the end of November, alongside Ex-Preston teammate Mathew Hudson. He scored on his debut the following day in a 2–1 loss to Buxton. He made a total of 3 appearances for the club.

Loan to Waterford
On 22 February 2021, he returned to Ireland, signing for League of Ireland Premier Division side Waterford on loan until 30 June 2021 ahead of their 2021 season. He made his debut for the club in the opening game of the season on 19 March 2021 as his side lost 1–0 away to newly promoted side Drogheda United. O'Reilly left the club at the end of June after 16 appearances for the club.

Second Stalybridge Celtic loan
On 19 November 2021 O'Reilly returned to Stalybridge Celtic on loan until the end of December. He made 4 league appearances for the club before returning to Preston North End.

St Patrick's Athletic loan
On 20 January 2022, O'Reilly signed for League of Ireland Premier Division runners up and FAI Cup holders St Patrick's Athletic on loan until 31 July, ahead of their 2022 season. On 11 February 2022, he made his debut for the club in the 2022 President of Ireland's Cup against Shamrock Rovers at Tallaght Stadium, scoring his penalty in the shootout as his side lost 5–4 on penalties after a 1–1 draw. O'Reilly was voted Player of the Month by the club's fans for June following a run of excellent performances. On 19 July 2022, he signed a loan extension until the end of the season in November. O'Reilly made his first appearance in European football on 21 July 2022 in a 1–1 draw with Slovenian side NŠ Mura in the UEFA Europa Conference League. He was named as the club's Player of the Month award for July 2022, his second month running to win the award. O'Reilly scored his first goal for the club in a 3–1 win away to Bohemians at Dalymount Park on 29 August 2022. On 7 October 2022, he scored a 93rd minute winner away to Dundalk to secure a crucial 2–1 win for his side in the race for Europe. He received the Young Player of the Year award at the club awards night after being voted by supporters.

Derry City
On 30 January 2023, O'Reilly departed Preston North End after six and a half years at the club, signing for League of Ireland Premier Division side Derry City for an undisclosed fee. O'Reilly made his debut on 10 February 2023 in a 2–0 win over Shamrock Rovers in the 2023 President of Ireland's Cup.

International career
O'Reilly has represented Republic of Ireland at various youth levels and was part of the squad which reached the quarter-finals of the 2018 UEFA European Under-17 Championship. On 19 September 2022, O'Reilly was called up to the Republic of Ireland U21 squad for the first time for their 2023 UEFA European Under-21 Championship Qualification Play-off games against Israel U21.

Career statistics

Honours
President of Ireland's Cup (1): 2023

References

2001 births
Living people
Republic of Ireland association footballers
Association football midfielders
Preston North End F.C. players
Hyde United F.C. players
Stalybridge Celtic F.C. players
Bamber Bridge F.C. players
Waterford F.C. players
St Patrick's Athletic F.C. players
Derry City F.C. players
Association footballers from County Cork
Association footballers from Cork (city)
Republic of Ireland youth international footballers
English Football League players
Northern Premier League players
League of Ireland players
Republic of Ireland expatriate association footballers
Expatriate footballers in England
Irish expatriate sportspeople in England